Carphophis (common name worm snakes) is a genus of small colubrid snakes endemic to the United States. The genus consists of two species.

Description
Worm snakes are small snakes, 35 cm (14 in) or less in total length. They are usually a dark brown in color on the upperside, with a lighter-colored, pink or orange underside. They are easily mistaken for other similar species, such as the earth snakes (genus Virginia) and the brown snakes  (genus Storeria). They have narrow heads, small eyes, and sharp tail tips. They are not venomous.

Behavior
Worm snakes are fossorial snakes, and spend the vast majority of their time buried in loose, rocky soil, or under forest leaf litter. They are abundant within their range, but rarely seen due to their secretive nature.

Reproduction
Little is known about their mating habits, but breeding likely occurs in early spring. The eggs are laid in early summer. Clutch size is normally two to five eggs, and hatching takes place in August or September. Hatchlings range in size from 7 to 12 cm (about 3-5 inches).

Diet
Worm snakes eat almost entirely earthworms, but they will also consume soft-bodied insects.

Predation
They are a common food source for ophiophagous snake species, such as the coral snakes, Micrurus fulvius and Micrurus tener, in areas in which they are sympatric.

Species and subspecies
Carphophis amoenus (Say, 1825) - worm snake
Carphophis amoenus amoenus (Say, 1825) - eastern worm snake
Carphophis amoenus helenae (Kennicott, 1859) - midwestern worm snake 
Carphophis vermis (Kennicott, 1859) - western worm snake

Geographic distribution
C. amoenus - Arkansas, eastern Missouri, Louisiana, Mississippi, Alabama, northern Georgia, South Carolina, North Carolina, Tennessee, Virginia, West Virginia, Kentucky, southern Illinois, southern Indiana, southern Ohio, Delaware, New Jersey, Maryland, Pennsylvania, southeastern New York, and Connecticut
C. vermis - southern Iowa, southeastern Nebraska, eastern Kansas, western Illinois, Missouri, Louisiana, eastern Oklahoma, and northeastern Texas with isolated records from southwestern Wisconsin, and southeastern Arkansas

References

Further reading
Boulenger, G.A. 1894. Catalogue of the Snakes in the British Museum (Natural History). Volume II., Containing the Conclusion of the Colubridæ Aglyphæ. Trustees of the British Museum (Natural History) (Taylor and Francis, Printers.) London. xi + 382 pp. + Plates I.- XX. (Genus Carphophis, p. 324.)
Gervais, P. 1843. In D'Orbigny, Ch. 1843. Dictionnaire Universel d'Histoire Naturelle, Nouvelle Édition. Tome Troisième [volume 3, BRU - CHY]. A. Pilon. Paris. 752 pp. (Carphophis, p. 262.)

External links

Illinois Natural History Survey -  Carphophis amoenus
Western worm snake, Carphophis vermis photographs
Western worm snake - Carphophis vermis Species account from the Iowa Reptile and Amphibian Field Guide

Carphophis
Snake genera
Taxa named by Paul Gervais